Nathaniel "Tank" Dell (born October 29, 1999) is an American football wide receiver for the Houston Cougars.

Career
Dell attended Mainland High School in Daytona Beach, Florida. He had originally committed to Florida International University (FIU) to play college football but attended Alabama A&M University instead. After one year at Alabama A&M in which he had 12 receptions for 364 yards and three touchdowns, he transferred to Independence Community College. In his lone year at Independence, he had 52 receptions for 766 yards and eight touchdowns.

Dell transferred to the University of Houston in 2020. In his first year at Houston, he led the team with 29 receptions for 428 yards and three touchdowns over eight games. In 2021, he again led the team with 90 receptions for 1,329 yards with 12 touchdowns. He returned to Houston as the number one receiver in 2022.

References

External links

Houston Cougars bio

Living people
Players of American football from Florida
American football wide receivers
Alabama A&M Bulldogs football players
Independence Pirates football players
Houston Cougars football players
1999 births